The following is the discography for Singaporean dance-pop girl group By2. They have released six studio albums, one extended play, and thirty-four singles to date.

Albums

Extended plays

Singles

Promotional  singles 

Discographies of Singaporean artists
Mandopop discographies